Sievierodonetsk Airport is a closed airport in the city of Sievierodonetsk, Luhansk Oblast in Ukraine.  It is relatively small and has one concrete runway which is 1,420 meters in length.  

It became the primary airport serving the oblast after Luhansk International Airport was destroyed during the War in the Donbas in 2014. During the 2022 Russian invasion of Ukraine, the airport was severely damaged in the Battle of Sievierodonetsk, rendering it unusable.

References 

Airports in Ukraine
Buildings and structures in Luhansk Oblast
Sievierodonetsk